La Salette of Quezon is a private, Catholic, coeducational, basic education institution run by the Missionaries of Our Lady of La Salette in Quezon, Isabela. Philippines. It was founded by the La Salettes in June 1960.

History
History accounts say that the school started its operation in June 1960 as a secondary education institution. After being successful in its operation as a high school, the administrators decided to open an Elementary department. La Salette of Quezon became a basic education institution.

Our Lady of La Salette

Our Lady of La Salette is the patroness of the school which is named after her. The Parish Church beside the campus was also named after Our Lady of La Salette since the school was originally owned by the Parish.

It was on September 19, 1846, when the Virgin Mary appeared to two French children named Mélanie Calvat and Maximin Giraud in the mountain of La Salette in France. It was said that the Virgin Mary is speaking with tears, and told the two children that unless people repented she would be forced to let go the arm of her son because it had become so heavy. The Virgin Mary went on to complain that she had to pray ceaselessly to her son for them, but the people still worked during Sundays and blasphemed. Mary also spoke of coming punishments for these sins, including crop blights and famine. She confided a secret to each of the children, which they were not to divulge, although eventually these secrets were made known to Pope Pius IX. Finally she asked the children to spread her message before disappearing. The famous phrase from the Virgin Mary goes "Come near my Children, do not be afraid...".

After the Apparition, only few people believed what the children saw and heard. The farmers who came into contact with the children where amazed at them. They were so ignorant, and yet they were able to transmit and communicate, in French, a complicated message which they did not understand well. As well, they were able to do this clearly and with precise descriptions. Mélanie Calvat and Maximin Giraud were constantly interrogated by curious people as well as their devoted ones. They simply said the same story, repeating it over and over. To those interested in going up the mountain, they take them to the place where Our Lady appeared. On several occasions, they were threatened with jail if they did not deny the alleged apparitions and if they continued to speak about them. Without fear or hesitation, they continued to report all the messages that Our Lady gave them.

The Apparition was approved by the name Our Lady of La Salette by Pope Pius IX and verified the apparition of the Virgin Mary.

Extra-curricular activities
Extra-curricular activities are one of the three main factors that contribute in the computation of grades for Salettinians. Competitions and other activities including club participations are counted with corresponding points.

Pupil Government Organization
The Pupil Government Organization or PGO is the student government inside the campus for the Elementary Department.

Central Board of Students
The Supreme Student Government or SSG is the student government inside the campus for the high school department. The candidates are allowed to campaign but were given limited time. Campaign paraphernalia have to be located in the designated areas. The CBS Officers are determined by an Election with voters comprising all the high school students. Positions include President, Vice President, Secretary and more.

Classroom Officers
Each class are required to have their own Officers to represent the class for School meetings organized by the President of the Supreme Student Government. The classroom officers are responsible for the wellness and peacefulness of the class.

Prayers
The Prayer of Angelus is prayed on the school sound system which is a sign of the dismissal for the Morning class while The Memorare of Our Lady of La Salette is played on school sound system as a mark for afternoon dismissal. The 3 o'clock prayer is also played on the school sound system at exactly 3:00 pm.

Celebrations

Intamurals
The Intramurals or sports Intramurals is usually celebrated every July. It is a one-day celebration starting with a Celebration of the Holy Eucharist and a Parade around the town led by the school Drum and Lyre Corps. The celebration starts in the morning and ends in the afternoon. Sports is the center of this celebration with the opposing teams compete with each other on different sport events.

The intramural sports programs are often organized on the campus to promote competition and fun among the students. In the afternoon, unfinished games and categories are continued on the celebration of the Foundation Day.

Foundation Day
The celebration of the Foundation starts every September 16 and ends on September 19 marking the Anniversary of the Apparition of Our Lady of La Salette. The Foundation Day is the most awaited event in a school year.

Buwan ng Wika
The Buwan ng Wika is always celebrated in schools in the Philippines every August. The school promotes the usage of Filipino in the school campus during this month. At the last week of August, Competitions are always held. Some of these are Slogan Making Contest, Poster Making Contest.

Nutrition Month
Every July, La Salette of Roxas celebrates Nutrition Month. During the last week of Celebration, there are also Slogan and Poster Making Contest with a theme about Nutrition. There are also Cooking Competition and Quiz Bee wherein the questions are all about their TLE subjects.

Others
Rosary Month
This is celebrated every October. Students are required to pray the Holy Rosary.

Alay sa Belen
During the month of December, students have to donate goods like used underwear, toys and basic commodities. Each section must earn their goods and they are being counted weekly with corresponding points. The section with the highest value of donations are announced to be the winner. The CBS officer is responsible in packing and distributing the rice, toys and canned goods etc.

Notable alumni
Priscilla Pangan
Dr. John Donnie Ramos
Atty. Eduardo Cabantac
Daryl Gascon
Lui Gascon

Schools in Isabela (province)
Catholic elementary schools in the Philippines
Catholic secondary schools in the Philippines